The Nick Straker Band were an English pop music group from London, England, led by musician and vocalist Nick Straker. Several members of the band were also in New Musik, and the band's line-up consisted of Straker along with Tony Mansfield, Tony Hibbert, David McShearer, Pete Hammond and Phil Towner. Their song "A Walk in the Park" peaked at No. 20 on the UK Singles Chart in 1980, having previously been a substantial hit in Continental Europe in 1979. Their most successful song in the US was "A Little Bit of Jazz", which spent one week at No. 1 on the Hot Dance Music/Club Play Chart in 1981.

Discography

Albums

Singles

See also
List of Billboard number-one dance club songs
List of artists who reached number one on the U.S. Dance Club Songs chart

References

External links
 
 

English electronic music groups
English dance music groups
English new wave musical groups
English boogie musicians
British post-disco music groups
Prelude Records artists
Musical groups from London